Kanakpur  is a village development committee in Rautahat District in the Narayani Zone of south-eastern Nepal. At the time of the 1991 Nepal census it had a population of 6,176 people living in 1,086 households.

References

Populated places in Rautahat District